Parmai Lal is an Indian politician. He was elected to the Lok Sabha,  the lower house of the Parliament of India from Hardoi, Uttar Pradesh in 1977 as a member of the Janata Party and in 1989 as member of the Janata Dal. He was earlier a member of the Uttar Pradesh Legislative Assembly.

References

External links
 Official biographical sketch in Parliament of India website

1944 births
India MPs 1977–1979
India MPs 1989–1991
Lok Sabha members from Uttar Pradesh
Living people
People from Hardoi district
Janata Dal politicians
Janata Party politicians
Lok Dal politicians